Prostanthera denticulata, commonly known as rough mint-bush, is a species of flowering plant in the family Lamiaceae and is endemic to coastal New South Wales. It is a straggling to almost prostrate, aromatic shrub with narrow egg-shaped leaves and purple to mauve flowers arranged in leaf axils or on the ends of branchlets.

Description
Flowering occurs in spring and early summer.

Taxonomy
Prostanthera denticulata was first formally described in 1810 by Robert Brown in Prodromus Florae Novae Hollandiae et Insulae Van Diemen.  A recent study of P. denticulata demonstrated that coastal forms are distinct from those found elsewhere in New South Wales and Victoria. As Brown made numerous collections of P. denticulata and did not specify a holotype, a lectotype was designated from one of Brown’s collections made at the head of Middle Harbour, Sydney. Accessions previously assigned as P. denticulata from Bathurst, Medway, Temora and West Wyalong were separated as the new species P. crocodyloides.

Distribution and habitat
Prostanthera denticulata grows in sandy, gravelly, well-drained soils derived from Triassic coarse-grained sandstone. Surrounding vegetation typically has heath-like elements in woodland or wet sclerophyll forest. It is known from the Central Coast between Bouddi National Park and the Royal National Park in New South Wales.

References

denticulata
Flora of New South Wales
Flora of Victoria (Australia)
Lamiales of Australia
Taxa named by Robert Brown (botanist, born 1773)
Plants described in 1810